Whitehouse were an English noise music band formed in 1980. The group is largely credited for the founding of the power electronics genre.

History and personnel
The name Whitehouse was chosen both in mock tribute to the British morality campaigner Mary Whitehouse, and in reference to a British pornographic magazine of the same name.

The group's founding member and sole constant was William Bennett. He began as a guitarist for Essential Logic. He wrote of those early years, "I often fantasised about creating a sound that could bludgeon an audience into submission." Bennett later recorded as Come (featuring contributions from the likes of Daniel Miller and J. G. Thirlwell) before forming Whitehouse in 1980. Bennett's first release as Whitehouse was Birthdeath Experience, released on his own Come Organisation label, which was immediately followed by the album Total Sex.

In 1981, Bennett released Erector, which was pressed on red vinyl and packaged in a shiny black sleeve with a photocopied picture of a penis. Erector deviated from the first two releases in experimenting with subsonic frequencies and contrasting low synth drones overlain with high-pitched screeches.

The group began performing live in 1982, with members Andrew McKenzie (The Hafler Trio) and Steven Stapleton (Nurse With Wound). In 2009, Bennett claimed that his pre-eminent inspiration was Yoko Ono: "Yoko's amazing music was by far the biggest influence on me, and Whitehouse, in the formative years (despite what some would have you believe)."

Philip Best joined the group in 1982 at the age of 14, after running away from home. He was a member on and off ever since.

The group was inactive for the second half of the 1980s. A "special biographical note" on the Susan Lawly website states, "All members of Whitehouse went to live outside London for varying reasons and pursued separate lives. There was a feeling in the group that all that could be achieved had been realised."

Eventually, Whitehouse re-emerged with a series of albums, recorded by the American audio engineer, Steve Albini, beginning with 1990's Thank Your Lucky Stars. Albini worked with the band until 1998, when Bennett took over all production duties.

Through the 1990s the most stable line-up was Bennett, Best, and the writer Peter Sotos. Sotos left in 2002, leaving the band as a two-piece.

The band had numerous other members in the 1980s including Kevin Tomkins, Steven Stapleton, Glenn Michael Wallis, John Murphy, Stefan Jaworzyn, Jim Goodall and Andrew McKenzie, though many of these participated only at live performances, not on recordings.

Bennett terminated Whitehouse in 2008 to concentrate on his Cut Hands project. He also has found success as an Italo disco DJ under the name "DJ Benetti".

Music
Whitehouse specialised in what they call "extreme electronic music". They were known for their controversial lyrics and imagery, which portrayed sadistic sex, rape, misogyny, serial murder, eating disorders, child abuse, neo-nazi fetishism and other forms of violence and abjection.

Whitehouse emerged as earlier industrial acts such as Throbbing Gristle and SPK were pulling back from noise and extreme sounds and embracing relatively more conventional musical genres. In opposition to this trend, Whitehouse wanted to take these earlier groups' sounds and fascination with extreme subject matter even further; as referenced on the sleeve of their first LP, the group wished to "cut pure human states" and produce "the most extreme music ever recorded". In doing so, they drew inspiration from some earlier experimental musicians and artists such as Alvin Lucier, Robert Ashley, and Yoko Ono as well as writers such as Marquis de Sade.

The signature sonic elements on their early recordings were simple, pulverizing electronic bass tones twinned with needling high frequencies, sometimes combined with ferocious washes of white noise, with or without vocals (usually barked orders, sinister whispers, and high-pitched screams). In a 1990 interview, Bennett recalled: "I remember seeing an issue of that punk fanzine Sniffin' Glue and it said that all you needed to make music was to learn three chords, and I thought why do you even need to know three chords to make music? Why do you even need to use a guitar? The idea of thunderous extreme noises appealed to me."

In the early 1990s the band phased out the analog equipment responsible for this sound, instead relying more heavily on computers. From 2000 they began incorporating percussive rhythms, sometimes from African instruments such as the djembe, both sampled and performed in-studio.

Reception and influence
Whitehouse were a key influence in the development of noise music as a musical genre in Europe, Japan, the US, and elsewhere. The early music of Whitehouse is often credited with pioneering the power electronics (a term Bennett himself coined on the blurb to the Psychopathia Sexualis album) and noise genres.

Alternative Press included Whitehouse in their 1996 list of 100 underground inspirations of the past 20 years, opining that "many will argue [Whitehouse] have beaten Throbbing Gristle at their own game."

The band's 2003 album Bird Seed was given an 'honourable mention' in the digital musics category of Austria's annual Prix Ars Electronica awards.

As Nick Cain of The Wire put it,

Discography

Studio albums
Birthdeath Experience (1980)
Total Sex (1980)
Erector (1981)
Dedicated to Peter Kürten (1981)
Buchenwald (1981)
New Britain (1982)
Psychopathia Sexualis (1982)
Right to Kill (1983)
Great White Death (1985)
Thank Your Lucky Stars (1990)
Twice Is Not Enough (1992)
Never Forget Death (1992)
Halogen (1994)
Quality Time (1995)
Mummy and Daddy (1998)
Cruise (2001)
Bird Seed (2003)
Asceticists 2006 (2006)
Racket (2007)

Singles
"Thank Your Lucky Stars" (1988)
"Still Going Strong" (1991)
"Just Like a Cunt" (1996)
"Cruise (Force the Truth)" (2001)
"Wriggle Like a Fucking Eel" (2002)

Live and other releases
The 150 Murderous Passions (split with Nurse with Wound) (1981)
Cream of the Second Coming (compilation) (1990)
Another Crack of the White Whip (compilation) (1991)
Tokyo Halogen (live album) (1995)
The Sound of Being Alive (compilation) (2016)

References

External links

Susan Lawly (record label, official band site)
Come Organisation (record label)
MEMORABILIA. COLLECTING SOUNDS WITH... William Bennett. Part I. Interview with William Bennett for Ràdio Web MACBA (2011). Museu d’Art Contemporani de Barcelona.
MEMORABILIA. COLLECTING SOUNDS WITH... William Bennett. Part II. A music selection by William Bennett (2012). Museu d’Art Contemporani de Barcelona.
[ Allmusic entry]

English electronic music duos
Noise musical groups
British industrial music groups
Musical groups established in 1980
Power electronics (music)